Baltar may refer to:

Count Baltar, villain of the original 1978 TV series Battlestar Galactica
Gaius Baltar, villain of the reimagined 2004 TV series Battlestar Galactica
Baltar, Ourense, a town in Galicia, Spain
Baltar (Paredes), a parish of the municipality of Paredes, Portugal

See also
Baaltars, a deity of the Persian Empire
Beltar (disambiguation)